Bourse - Grand-Place/Beurs - Grote Markt premetro station is a premetro (underground tram) station in central Brussels, Belgium, located under the Boulevard Anspach/Anspachlaan, next to the Place de la Bourse/Beursplein and the former Brussels Stock Exchange, after which it is named. It is also located metres from the Grand-Place.

The station in part of the North–South Axis, a tram tunnel crossing the city centre between Brussels-North railway station and Albert premetro station. Brussels trams stopping at that station are the lines 3 and 4, as well as evening services 31, 32 and 33. A connection with bus routes 46, 48, 86 and 95 is possible at ground level.

External links
STIB/MIVB official website

Brussels metro stations
City of Brussels